The Fas receptor, also known as Fas, FasR,  apoptosis antigen 1 (APO-1 or APT), cluster of differentiation 95 (CD95) or tumor necrosis factor receptor superfamily member 6 (TNFRSF6), is a protein that in humans is encoded by the FAS gene. Fas was first identified using a monoclonal antibody generated by immunizing mice with the FS-7 cell line. Thus, the name Fas is derived from FS-7-associated surface antigen.

The Fas receptor is a death receptor on the surface of cells that leads to programmed cell death (apoptosis) if it binds its ligand, Fas ligand (FasL). It is one of two apoptosis pathways, the other being the mitochondrial pathway.

Gene 

FAS receptor gene is located on the long arm of chromosome 10 (10q24.1) in humans and on chromosome 19 in mice. The gene lies on the plus (Watson strand) and is 25,255 bases in length organized into nine protein encoding exons. Similar sequences related by evolution (orthologs) are found in most mammals.

Protein 

Previous reports have identified as many as eight splice variants, which are translated into seven isoforms of the protein. Apoptosis-inducing Fas receptor is dubbed isoform 1 and is a type 1 transmembrane protein.  Many of the other isoforms are rare haplotypes that are usually associated with a state of disease.  However, two isoforms, the apoptosis-inducing membrane-bound form and the soluble form, are normal products whose production via alternative splicing is regulated by the cytotoxic RNA binding protein TIA1.

The mature Fas protein has 319 amino acids, has a predicted molecular weight of 48 kiloDaltons and is divided into 3 domains: an extracellular domain, a transmembrane domain, and a cytoplasmic domain. The extracellular domain has 157 amino acids and is rich in cysteine residues. The transmembrane and cytoplasmic domains have 17 and 145 amino acids respectively. Exons 1 through 5 encode the extracellular region. Exon 6 encodes the transmembrane region. Exons 7-9 encode the intracellular region.

Function 

Fas forms the death-inducing signaling complex (DISC) upon ligand binding. Membrane-anchored Fas ligand trimer on the surface of an adjacent cell causes oligomerization of Fas.
Recent studies which suggested the trimerization of Fas could not be validated. Other models suggested the oligomerization up to 5-7 Fas molecules in the DISC.
This event is also mimicked by binding of an agonistic Fas antibody, though some evidence suggests that the apoptotic signal induced by the antibody is unreliable in the study of Fas signaling. To this end, several clever ways of trimerizing the antibody for in vitro research have been employed.

Upon ensuing death domain (DD) aggregation, the receptor complex is internalized via the cellular endosomal machinery. This allows the adaptor molecule FADD to bind the death domain of Fas through its own death domain.

FADD also contains a death effector domain (DED) near its amino terminus, which facilitates binding to the DED of FADD-like interleukin-1 beta-converting enzyme (FLICE), more commonly referred to as caspase-8. FLICE can then self-activate through proteolytic cleavage into p10 and p18 subunits, two each of which form the active heterotetramer enzyme. Active caspase-8 is then released from the DISC into the cytosol, where it cleaves other effector caspases, eventually leading to DNA degradation, membrane blebbing, and other hallmarks of apoptosis.

Recently, Fas has also been shown to promote tumor growth, since during tumor progression, it is frequently downregulated or cells are rendered apoptosis resistant. Cancer cells in general, regardless of their Fas apoptosis sensitivity, depend on constitutive activity of Fas. This is stimulated by cancer-produced Fas ligand for optimal growth.

Although Fas has been shown to promote tumor growth in the above mouse models, analysis of the human cancer genomics database revealed that FAS is not significantly focally amplified across a dataset of 3131 tumors (FAS is not an oncogene), but is significantly focally deleted across the entire dataset of these 3131 tumors, suggesting that FAS functions as a tumor suppressor in humans.

In cultured cells, FasL induces various types of cancer cell apoptosis through the Fas receptor. In AOM-DSS-induced colon carcinoma and MCA-induced sarcoma mouse models, it has been shown that Fas acts as a tumor suppressor. Furthermore, the Fas receptor also mediates tumor-specific cytotoxic T lymphocyte (CTL) anti-tumor cytotoxicity.  In addition to the well-described on-target CTL anti-tumor cytotoxicity, Fas has been ascribed with a distinct function - the induction of bystander tumor cell death even amongst cognate antigen non-expressing (bystander) cells. CTL-mediated bystander killing was described by the Fleischer Lab in 1986  and later attributed to fas-mediated lysis in vitro by the Austin Research Institute, Cellular Cytotoxicity Laboratory. More recently, fas-mediated bystander tumor cell killing was demonstrated in vivo by the Lymphoma Immunotherapy Program at Mount Sinai School of Medicine using T cells and CAR-T cells, similar to additional in vitro work using bispecific antibodies performed at Amgen.

Role in apoptosis 

Some reports have suggested that the extrinsic Fas pathway is sufficient to induce complete apoptosis in certain cell types through DISC assembly and subsequent caspase-8 activation. These cells are dubbed Type 1 cells and are characterized by the inability of anti-apoptotic members of the Bcl-2 family (namely Bcl-2 and Bcl-xL) to protect from Fas-mediated apoptosis. Characterized Type 1 cells include H9, CH1, SKW6.4 and SW480, all of which are lymphocyte lineages except the latter, which is a colon adenocarcinoma lineage. However, evidence for crosstalk between the extrinsic and intrinsic pathways exists in the Fas signal cascade.

In most cell types, caspase-8 catalyzes the cleavage of the pro-apoptotic BH3-only protein Bid into its truncated form, tBid. BH-3 only members of the Bcl-2 family exclusively engage anti-apoptotic members of the family (Bcl-2, Bcl-xL), allowing Bak and Bax to translocate to the outer mitochondrial membrane, thus permeabilizing it and facilitating release of pro-apoptotic proteins such as cytochrome c and Smac/DIABLO, an antagonist of inhibitors of apoptosis proteins (IAPs).

Interactions 

Fas receptor has been shown to interact with:
 Caspase 8, 
 Caspase 10,
 CFLAR,
 FADD, 
 Fas ligand,
 PDCD6, and
 Small ubiquitin-related modifier 1.

References

Further reading

External links 
 
 
 

Immune system
Programmed cell death
Signal transduction